A parliamentary leader is a political title or a descriptive term used in various countries to designate the person leading a parliamentary group or caucus in a legislative body, whether it be a national or sub-national legislature. They are their party's most senior member of parliament (MP) in most parliamentary democracies. 

A party leader may be the same person as the parliamentary leader, or the roles may be separated.

Terminology
In many countries, the position of leader of a political party (that is, the organisational leader) and leader of a parliamentary group are separate positions, and while they are often held by the same person, this is not always or automatically the case. If the party leader is a member of the government, holds a different political office outside the parliamentary body in question, or no political office at all, the position of parliamentary leader is frequently held by a different person.

In English, the leader may be referred to as a "parliamentary chairman", "group leader" or simply "parliamentary leader", among other names.

Examples

Australia and New Zealand
In Australian and New Zealand politics, the party figure commonly described as "leader" is usually an MP responsible for managing the party's business within parliament. Party constitutions will typically distinguish between the parliamentary leader and the organisational leader (who typically is outside of parliament), with the latter often termed a "federal president" or "party president". The two roles are organisationally distinct even if close cooperation is expected.

Canada

A parliamentary leader is chosen in Canadian politics to lead their caucus in a legislative body, whether it be the House of Commons or a provincial legislature. They serve as interim legislative leaders, when a party leader either has no seat in the legislative body, during a transition period preceding, or following a leadership contest.

European Parliament
Each of the seven political groups of the European Parliament has its own group leader. The groups within the European Parliament are often very broad, so the position of the group leader is a unifying one—they may help to consolidate MEPs with similar outlooks ahead of important votes. The groups are organisationally separate from a European political party, and multiple parties often ally as a single group, thus the distinction between a party and a parliamentary leader is usually strict.

Germany
In German politics, leaders of the major parties have often been heads of government of the various states rather than members of the national parliament. Hence, the position of parliamentary leader in the federal parliament (Germany also has 16 state parliaments) is often occupied by a different person. The parliamentary leader has the supreme responsibility for coordinating the work of the MPs representing his or her party. Even when the party leader is a member of the national parliament, the parliamentary leader can be a different person. For instance,
Friedrich Merz was parliamentary leader while Angela Merkel was party leader for some years while the CDU was in opposition. If the party leader is the chancellor or a member of the government, another person always is the parliamentary leader.

The Netherlands

In both houses of the Dutch parliament, parliamentary leaders are formally elected by their peers in the parliamentary group.

In the House of Representatives, leaders of opposition parties are also their parties' parliamentary leader. Leaders of coalition parties might choose to enter the cabinet, serving as prime minister if their party is the largest in the coalition or otherwise as Deputy Prime Minister. Otherwise they remain parliamentary leaders. 

In the Senate, parliamentary leaders are never party leaders.

United Kingdom
In British politics, the leader of a party is typically the same person as the parliamentary leader. The leader may not fully control the party bureaucracy. The leader may be chosen by members of parliament (MPs) from among their number, or elected by the wider party membership at a party conference, but once elected must retain the support of the parliamentary party. Similarly, the position of prime minister may be given to the parliamentary leader (the party leader, in the case of the two major parties) of the largest political party in parliament, with the expectation they will be able secure and retain the confidence of a majority of MPs.

Some smaller parties have parliamentary leaders in the national parliament (in Westminster) who are separate from the party leaders—the party leader may hold office in a devolved (sub-national) parliament or assembly. The party leader of the Scottish nationalist SNP, the UK's third largest party by number of MPs, is Nicola Sturgeon, who serves as first minister of Scotland, and does not sit at Westminster. Thus, the parliamentary group of the SNP at the Westminster parliament is led by SNP MP Stephen Flynn.

See also

 Floor leader
 Frontbencher
 Majority leader
 Minority leader

References

Politics

da:Politisk leder
fr:Leader parlementaire